Bomani Parker (born September 30, 1967), formerly named Parker White, is an American boxer. He was born in Cincinnati, Ohio.  His parents migrated to California shortly after his birth. Parker grew up in Richmond, California.

Amateur career
His boxing career started in West Oakland, out of the Boys and Girls Club. He fought as a National Golden Gloves Champion in 1986 weighing in as a middleweight at 165 pounds. He also became a member of the American Olympic boxing team fighting as a south-paw (left-handed). He fought in the Goodwill Games and to become an American Golden Gloves contender. He is the only American boxer to hold the record with the most defeats against Russia a total of six wins. Parker also holds the record for the most defeats against Cuba, a total of four wins. He competed in a championship bout in the 1988 Olympic Trials. In that bout, Bomani Parker fought against Alfred Cole.

Professional career
Parker went on to become a professional boxer making his debut in October 1988.  He moved on to win the WBC Light Heavyweight Continental Americas title.  He eventually fought at cruiserweight. He eventually moved up to the heavyweight class in 1995. He held a 14-6-1 record before his career was cut short by a 13-year prison sentence for possession of controlled substances. He made a comeback in 2012 losing to Rodney Hernandez by a unanimous decision.

Professional boxing record

References 

 http://www.reviewjournal.com/lvrj_home/1997/Oct-26-Sun-1997/sports/6302672.html
 HighBeam
 http://www.ootpdevelopments.com/board/showthread.php?t=55000&page=194
 http://www.boxing-records.com/palm/voirlist.php?Ind=P&Lg=us
 HighBeam
 https://web.archive.org/web/20030311162655/http://www.sportsnetwork.com/default.asp?c=sportsnetwork&page=boxing%2Fstat%2Fid.htm
 http://www.reviewjournal.com/lvrj_home/1997/Oct-28-Tue-1997/sports/6312383.html
 http://www.fightfax.com/federalid.htm
 https://web.archive.org/web/20070802020719/http://www.scandinavian-boxing-rankings.dk/scandinavian-records/michael-lindblad.htm
 http://www.usaboxing.org/854.htm
 https://web.archive.org/web/20071031064058/http://www.goodwillgames.com/html/past_1986boxing.html

Boxers from California
1967 births
Living people
American male boxers
Heavyweight boxers
African-American boxers
Light-heavyweight boxers
Competitors at the 1986 Goodwill Games
21st-century African-American people
20th-century African-American sportspeople